Kingsley Baird is a Wellington-based artist and designer whose commissions include the Tomb of the Unknown Warrior at the National War Memorial of New Zealand and Te Korowai Rangimarie – Cloak of Peace – at Nagasaki Peace Park.

His work – primarily in sculpture – is concerned mostly with themes of memory and remembrance, loss and reconciliation, and cultural identity. It comprises collaborative landscape and urban design projects, installation art, video art and painting, as well as community projects. His commissions include the Australia-New Zealand Memorial, Canberra, and the kererū sculpture in Tawa village.

Baird holds a Master of Fine Art degree from RMIT, Melbourne, and a Diploma in Arts from Victoria University of Wellington. He is currently a practising artist and designer, and Associate Professor at the College of Creative Arts, Massey University of Wellington.

Further reading
 Tomb of the Unknown Warrior, Government of New Zealand
 Kingsley Baird, Proposal for Nagasaki Peace Park, November 2005 accessed at    – unveiled Nov 2006 at

External links
 Kingsley Baird's website

Living people
Academic staff of the Massey University
Victoria University of Wellington alumni
RMIT University alumni
People from Wellington City
20th-century New Zealand sculptors
20th-century New Zealand male artists
21st-century New Zealand sculptors
21st-century New Zealand male artists
Year of birth missing (living people)